Senator Leader may refer to:

George M. Leader (1918–2013), Pennsylvania State Senate
Guy Leader (1887–1978), Pennsylvania State Senate